Sir Saul Samuel, 1st Baronet  (2 November 182029 August 1900) was an Australian colonial merchant, member of parliament, pastoralist, and prominent Jew. Samuel achieved many breakthroughs for Jews in the colonial community of New South Wales including the first Jew to become a magistrate, the first Jew elected to parliament, the first Jew to become a minister of the Crown.

Early years and background
Samuel was born in London, England on 2 November 1820, the posthumous son of Sampson Samuel and his wife Lydia, née Lyons. Samuel arrived in Australia on 25 August 1832 aboard The Brothers with his mother to meet with Samuel's brother, Lewis, and their uncle, Samuel Lyons, was had arrived in colonial New South Wales a few years earlier. Educated at schools run by W. T Cape, Samuel was initially employed at his uncles' accounting house, before he and his brother formed their own mercantile firm.

After purchasing  of land at Bathurst, he abandoned pastoral interests following the 1851 gold rush and business interests became his main focus.

He married Henrietta Matilda Goldsmith-Levien on 16 December 1857 and had two daughters and two sons. He married Sarah Louisa Isaacs on 31 October 1877 (in Auckland, New Zealand) and had one son.

Political career

In 1854, Samuel became an elective Member of the first Legislative Council of New South Wales, representing the Counties of Roxburgh and Wellington between 1854 and 1856. Elected to the first responsible government, Samuel became a member of the Legislative Assembly representing the Counties of Roxburgh and Wellington from 1854 until 1856. Re-elected to the Assembly in June 1859 and then again in November 1859, Samuel served as member for Orange until 1860. Samuel became member for Wellington in 1862, serving until 1869, and then again as member for Orange, serving between 1869 until 1872, before briefly serving as member for East Sydney during 1872. In 1872, Samuel was appointed a Life Member of Legislative Council, where he sat until he retirement from parliamentary life in 1880.

Treasurer and Postmaster General
Samuel served as Colonial Treasurer three times during his parliamentary career including in the Forster ministry between 1859 and 1860, the fourth Cowper ministry between 1865 and 1866, and the second Robertson ministry between 1868 and 1870. Samuel resigned as Treasurer in the Cowper ministry after his budget proposals for trade licences and increased duties on tea and sugar had been defeated. In 1870, at the Intercolonial Conference in Melbourne, Samuel proposed intercolonial free trade to settle the border customs dispute. He hoped to abolish ad valorem duties but his plans for a tax on incomes of over £200 were bitterly contested and led to the downfall of the government in December 1870.

Between 1872 and 1880, Samuel served as Postmaster-General on three occasions under Premier, Henry Parkes, including the first (1872–1875), second (1877), and third (1878–1883) ministries. During this period, Samuel established the General Post Office and negotiated a subsidized mail service from England to Australia via USA.

Mining involvement 
In 1875, he reopened a copper mine at Coombing Park near Carcoar—in partnership with Lewis Lloyd—and in 1876, a copper smelter was built close to it.

Career after politics
After politics, Samuel pursued his business interests including Chairman of Australian Mutual Provident Society and of Pacific Fire and Marine Insurance Company. Between 1880 and 1897, Samuel was the sixth Agent-General for New South Wales in London and was a director of Mercantile Bank of Sydney. An energetic, shrewd and efficient representative, he helped negotiate government loans and by 1885 claimed that he had raised £30 million. He fostered assisted immigration, negotiated with the Peninsular and Oriental and the Orient shipping companies for weekly mail services to the colony and in 1885 about the New South Wales Contingent to the Sudan. He was a commissioner for New South Wales at the 1883 Amsterdam Exhibition and represented the colony at the 1887 Colonial Conference in London. In 1891 he also represented Queensland at the Postal Convention in Vienna.

He was active in Jewish affairs, including the Board of Management of York Street Synagogue. On 26 January 1875 he laid the foundation stone for the Great Synagogue in Elizabeth Street, Sydney, and was later its president.

Samuel was invested as a Companion of the Order of St Michael and St George (CMG) in 1874, and was elevated as a Knight Commander (KCMG) in 1882. He was made a Privy Councillor in 1884, was invested of a Companion of the Order of the Bath in 1886 in recognition of his services in connection with the Colonial and Indian Exhibition, and was created baronet in 1886.

References

 

Members of the New South Wales Legislative Council
Members of the New South Wales Legislative Assembly
Australian Knights Commander of the Order of St Michael and St George
Australian Companions of the Order of the Bath
Baronets in the Baronetage of the United Kingdom
Australian recipients of a British baronetcy
1820 births
1900 deaths
Jewish Australian politicians
Treasurers of New South Wales
English emigrants to colonial Australia
19th-century Australian politicians
Agents-General for New South Wales
Australian members of the Privy Council of the United Kingdom